Detlev Müller-Siemens (born 30 July 1957) is a German composer and conductor.

Life and career 
Born in Hamburg, Müller-Siemens began with piano lessons at age six and began composing. He was invited to a composition class at the Musikhochschule Köln at age 13. He studied piano, composition and theory at the Musikhochschule Hamburg from 1970 with Günter Friedrichs. From 1973 to 1980, he studied with György Ligeti. He studied at the Conservatoire de Paris in 1977/78 with Olivier Messiaen. Back in Hamburg, he studied piano with Volker Banfield, and conducting with Christoph von Dohnányi. In 1985, he studied conducting further with Klauspeter Seibel.

In 1981, he was an assistant at the Paris Opéra for Ligeti's Le Grand Macabre. He was Kapellmeister of the Städtische Bühnen Freiburg from 1986 to 1988.

From 1991 to 2005, he was professor of composition and music theory at the Basel Music Academy, then professor for at the University of Vienna.

An engagement with the work of Samuel Beckett since 1999 has been reflected in his opera Bing, the composition the space of a step for orchestra as well as in the chamber music works Light blue, almost white and ... called dusk.

Prizes and awards 
 1980/1982: Villa Massimo, Rome
 1986: Schneider-Schott Music Prize
 1988: Rolf-Liebermann Grant
 1990: Rolf-Liebermann prize

Work 
Compositions by Müller-Siemens were published by Schott Music, including:
 Under Neonlight I for ensemble, 1980/81
 Under Neonlight II for piano, 1980–83
 Piano Concerto, 1980–1981
 Viola Concerto, 1983–1984
 Under Neonlight III for piano, 1987
 Quatre Passages for orchestra, 1988
 Horn Concerto, 1988–1989
 Die Menschen, opera, 1989–1990
 Carillon for orchestra, 1991
 Double Concerto for violin, viola and orchestra, 1992
 Phoenix 1,2,3 for ensemble, 1993–1995
 Maiastra for orchestra, 1995–1996
 Cuts for alto saxophone and ensemble, 1996/97
 Light blue, almost white for ensemble, 1998
 Bing, musical theatre, 1998–2000
 String Trio, 2002
 Die Aussicht for choir and ensemble, 2003/04
 the space of a step for orchestra, 2003/04
 distant traces (in memoriam György Ligeti) for violin, viola and piano, 2007
 lost traces for piano quartet, 2007
 ...called dusk (in memoriam György Ligeti) for violoncello and piano, 2008
 Kommos for large ensemble, 2008/09
 Privacy (in memoriam László Polgár) for clarinet, violin and piano, 2010
 ...called dusk II for string quartet, 2011
 Three piano pieces, 2012
 ... called dusk IV for orchestra, 2012/13
 ... called dusk III for ensemble, 2014
 ... called dusk V for violin solo, 2014
 Subsong 1 for ensemble, 2015

References

External links 
 

German male composers
20th-century classical composers
German conductors (music)
1957 births
Living people
Musicians from Hamburg
Conservatoire de Paris alumni
20th-century German male musicians